Mário das Neves Galvão (born 2 November 1916) was a Portuguese footballer who played defender for Sporting and Benfica in the Portuguese Liga. Galvão gained 1 cap for the Portugal national team, when he played in a 4-0 victory against Hungary in Lisbon 9 January 1938.

References

External links 
 
 

1916 births
Possibly living people
Sporting CP footballers
S.L. Benfica footballers
Portugal international footballers
Portuguese footballers
Primeira Liga players
Sportspeople from Coimbra
Association football defenders